San Ignacio de Velasco, is the capital of the José Miguel de Velasco Province and the San Ignacio de Velasco Municipality in the Santa Cruz Department of Bolivia.

History
The Jesuit mission of San Ignacio de Velasco was founded in 1748 by the Jesuit missionaries Diego Contreras and Michael Streicher (also known as Areijer). The mission was inhabited by indigenous Ugaraños (Ayoreo). It was partially settled by inhabitants of San Ignacio de Zamucos, another Jesuit mission which had been abandoned in 1745.

People
In 1996, the municipal government published the population as 12,600 persons.  It is the largest city in Velasco, and the largest city between metropolitan Santa Cruz and the Brazilian border.

Languages
Camba Spanish is the most commonly used everyday language. The most common indigenous language in San Ignacio and surroundings is the Ignaciano dialect of Chiquitano.

Geography
San Ignacio is located in the south-central region of the province of Velasco.  It is connected to Santa Cruz via bus lines utilizing a dirt highway to San Javier in the province of Ñuflo de Chávez.  From San Javier to Santa Cruz, the highway is paved.  To the east, similar bus lines connect San Ignacio to the Brazilian city of Cáceres and utilized an unpaved road.  The city has an airport (airport code SNG) with a dirt airstrip.
San Ignacio is located on the man-made lake, Guapomo, which also serves as the city's supply of fresh water.

Demographics
Nearly all of the people of San Ignacio are indigenous or mestizo, i.e. Camba. Post-World War II German immigrants have a small presence, as well Mennonites.

Religion
The city is the seat of the Roman Catholic Diocese of San Ignacio de Velasco.

See also
 St. Ignatius Cathedral, San Ignacio de Velasco
 List of Jesuit sites
 List of the Jesuit Missions of Chiquitos

References

External links 

 Map of the José Miguel de Velasco Province

Populated places in Santa Cruz Department (Bolivia)
Populated places established in 1749
Jesuit Missions of Chiquitos